Trostenets (Тростенец) is a Slavic name of a number of places:

Trostyanets, several places in Ukraine
Trastsianets (disambiguation), several places in Belarus
Troscianiec, places in Poland